Sayed Al-Tubaikh (born 31 May 1965) is a Kuwaiti judoka. He competed in the men's half-middleweight event at the 1984 Summer Olympics.

References

1965 births
Living people
Kuwaiti male judoka
Olympic judoka of Kuwait
Judoka at the 1984 Summer Olympics
Place of birth missing (living people)